Thonzylamine (or neohetramine) is an antihistamine and anticholinergic used as an antipruritic.

Synthesis

See also 
Zolamine

References 

H1 receptor antagonists
Phenol ethers
Dimethylamino compounds
Aminopyrimidines